Kamayevo (Qamay; , Qamay) is a rural locality (a selo) in Starokuruchevsky Selsoviet, Bakalinsky District, Bashkortostan, Russia. The population was 243 as of 2010.

Geography 
It is located 31 km from Bakaly and 12 km from Starokuruchevo.

References 

Rural localities in Bakalinsky District